Pyar Diwana is a 1972 Bollywood comedy film directed by Samar Chatterjee. The film stars Kishore Kumar, Mumtaz in lead roles.

Plot 
It is a love story a young wealthy boy Sunil who falls in love with his classmate Mamta. Sunil's family is against their relationship because they wants other girl in their choice as Sunil's wife.

Cast
Kishore Kumar as Sunil 
Mumtaz as Mamta
Padma Khanna as Rekha
Sunder as Dr. Sundar
Iftekhar
S. Bannerji as Sunil's Uncle

Soundtrack

References

External links
 

1972 films
1970s Hindi-language films
1972 comedy films
Indian comedy films